Milan Tiff (born July 5, 1949) is an American track and field athlete. He is best known for his triple jumping, but his skills pass through several arenas. He was the bronze medalist in the 1975 Pan American Games.  At the Pan Am Games, his name shows the additional name of Abdul Rahman, and in the 1976 Olympic Trials and 1976-1977 National Championships he used the name Caleb Abdul Rahman but he has not gone by that name in other competitions since that period in time. In 1978 he used Milan Tiff in the National Championships.  Tiff was an elite black athlete at UCLA at the same time as Kareem Abdul-Jabbar, in an era when converting to Islam was happening. By 1980, he was a favorite to win the 1980 Summer Olympics in Moscow before the 1980 Summer Olympics boycott.

Early life and career 
A childhood victim of Osgood-Schlatter disease, he did not walk until he was age 8.  He went on to become the first American to jump 57 feet while winning his second USA Outdoor Track and Field Championships.  He expected to retire from the sport after the Olympics, but continues to jump in Masters athletics events into his 60s.  He has held several Masters World Records as he has passed through the age groups.  In 2009, small gust of wind is all that prevented him from equalling the M60 world record.

Growing up in Shaker Heights, Ohio, June 1968, set a state of Ohio high school triple jump record at 49’-11”.  1969, he first attended college at Miami University Ohio.  March 1970 (in Detroit) Tiff won the NCAA championship triple jump. Later, switching to UCLA to work with Jim Bush, where he was a teammate of John Smith and Dwight Stones.  While there he won the 1973 NCAA Championship in the Triple Jump.  Later he joined Bush as an assistant coach  After completing UCLA, he was a member of the Southern California Striders.  He was ranked in the world top ten twice, 1975 and 1977.

A talented painter, he spends many hours working on art.  He approaches many other activities with an artistic perspective.  Like several athletes of his era he acted in the 1982 movie Personal Best.  Later he trained Emilio Estevez for two of his mid-1990s film roles.  He has continued to train athletes at UCLA including many NBA players.  In 1991 he wrote a book on his own form of exercise called "Traveling light:  an original form of exercise".  He was later credited on James Ingram's album "It's Real" as "giving us the map."

In 1979, he was inducted into the Mt. SAC Relays Hall of Fame.

Tiff's father Benjamin ran on the East Technical High School (Cleveland) sprint relay team with Jesse Owens.

Tiff's sister, Michele Tiff-Hill was a 1984 Olympic Trials Qualifier in the Marathon.

Olympic Trials 

Tiff placed 10th at the 1972 trials, and competed in the rounds at the 1976 trials.

References

External links

 OATCCC Hall of Fame
 Mt Sac Relays Hall of Fame

1949 births
Living people
Sportspeople from Shaker Heights, Ohio
Track and field athletes from California
Track and field athletes from Ohio
American male triple jumpers
American masters athletes
Pan American Games track and field athletes for the United States
Pan American Games bronze medalists for the United States
Pan American Games medalists in athletics (track and field)
Athletes (track and field) at the 1975 Pan American Games
World record setters in athletics (track and field)
African-American male track and field athletes
University of California, Los Angeles alumni
UCLA Bruins men's track and field athletes
Medalists at the 1975 Pan American Games
21st-century African-American people
20th-century African-American sportspeople